The 2014–15 Liga Profesional de Primera División season, also known as the 2014–15 Copa Uruguaya or the 2014–15 Campeonato Uruguayo, was the 111th season of Uruguay's top-flight football league, and the 84th in which was is professional. Danubio was the defending champion.

Teams

Torneo Apertura

Standings

Torneo Clausura

Standings

Aggregate table

Relegation

Championship playoff
Nacional and Peñarol qualified for the championship playoffs as the Apertura and Clausura winners, respectively. Additionally, Nacional re-qualified as the team with the most points in the season aggregate table. Given this situation, an initial playoff was held between the two teams. Nacional would become the season champion with a win; Peñarol needed to win the playoff to force a two-legged final.

Semi-final

References

External links
Asociación Uruguaya de Fútbol 
Tournament regulations 

2014-15
1
2014 in South American football leagues
2015 in South American football leagues